Allen McKay (5 February 1927 – 2 May 2013) was a British Labour Party politician.

Biography

Born in Barnsley, McKay was elected Member of Parliament (MP) for the South Yorkshire constituency of Penistone in a 1978 by-election following the death of the Labour MP John Mendelson, serving there until the seat was abolished for the 1983 general election.  He was then elected as MP for Barnsley West and Penistone, and held that seat until he retired at the 1992 general election.

Sources
Times Guide to the House of Commons, 1987

External links 
 

 

1927 births
2013 deaths
Labour Party (UK) MPs for English constituencies
UK MPs 1974–1979
UK MPs 1979–1983
UK MPs 1983–1987
UK MPs 1987–1992
Politics of Penistone
Politics of Barnsley